Razek may refer to:
Edward Razek, American businessperson known for Victoria's Secret Angels
Abed Razek, a male Muslim given name, and in modern usage, surname. 
Ghada Abdel Razek, Egyptian actress
Mohamed Abdel Razek, Bazoka, Egyptian footballer who plays
Samy Abdel Razek, Egyptian sport shooter.
Abdel Razek Ibrahim, Egyptian rower
Mustafa Abdel-Razek, Egyptian Islamic philosopher
Yousra Abdel Razek, Egyptian table tennis player
 Ali Abdel Raziq aka Ali Abdel-Razek